It Follows is a 2014 American supernatural psychological horror film written and directed by David Robert Mitchell. It stars Maika Monroe as a young woman who is pursued by a supernatural entity after a sexual encounter and must have sex with another individual to avoid it. Keir Gilchrist, Daniel Zovatto, Jake Weary, Olivia Luccardi, and Lili Sepe appear in supporting roles.

It Follows debuted at the 2014 Cannes Film Festival and was later purchased by Radius-TWC for distribution. After a successful limited release beginning on March 13, 2015, the film had a wide release on March 27, 2015. It received acclaim from critics; praise was directed at the film’s originality and Monroe’s performance. It grossed $23.3 million worldwide against a $1.3 million budget.

Plot
A young woman named Annie flees from her house in fear, but there is no visible threat. She takes her parents' car and drives to the beach, where she tearfully tells her father over the phone that she loves him. At dawn, it is revealed that she has been brutally murdered.

Afterwards, Jaime "Jay" Height goes on a date with her new boyfriend, Hugh, to the movies. Hugh points out a young girl in the back of the theater. When Jay says she cannot see the girl, Hugh becomes unnerved and asks that they leave. On another date, Hugh and Jay have sex in his car, but afterwards, he incapacitates Jay with chloroform and she wakes up tied to a wheelchair. Hugh explains that he has passed an entity on to her through intercourse. It will perpetually be walking towards Jay's location at all times, no matter where she is. If it catches Jay, it will kill her and pursue the previous person to have passed it on: Hugh, who is passing it to Jay as leverage. Hugh's claims are proven accurate when a naked woman appears and walks straight for Jay. Hugh drives Jay home and flees.

The next day, the police cannot find the naked woman or Hugh, who was living under a false identity. At school, Jay sees an old woman in a hospital gown walking towards her, invisible to others. Jay's sister, Kelly and her friends, Paul Bolduan and Yara Davis, agree to help and spend the night in Jay and Kelly's house. That night, someone smashes the kitchen window; Paul investigates but sees no one. Inside the house, Jay sees a disheveled, urinating, half-naked woman walking toward her and runs upstairs to the others, who cannot see the entity. When a tall man enters the bedroom, Jay flees the house; her friends catch up to her at a nearby playground.

With the help of their neighbor, Greg Hannigan, the group discovers Hugh's real name – Jeff Redmond – and traces him to his address. Jeff's mother answers the door and Jay realizes that the naked woman she had seen coming for her in the Packard Plant was in the form of Mrs. Redmond. Jeff explains that the entity began pursuing him after a one-night stand and that Jay can pass it on by having sex with someone else. Greg drives Jay, Kelly, Yara, and Paul to his family's lake house and teaches Jay to shoot a revolver. The entity arrives in the form of Yara and attacks Jay on the lakefront. Jay's friends ward it off by breaking a chair over its body and Jay shoots it several times until it falls over, but it recovers unharmed and attacks Jay again, this time taking the form of a boy who lives next door to Jay. She flees in Greg's car, crashes into a cornfield and wakes up in a hospital with a broken arm. Greg has sex with Jay in the hospital, as he does not believe the entity exists.

Days later, Jay sees the entity in the form of Greg walking towards Greg's house, smashing a window at Greg's house and entering. Jay tries to warn the real Greg by telephone, but he does not answer. She runs into the house and finds the entity in the form of Greg's half-naked mother knocking on his door. It stares at Jay for a few moments before continuing to knock. Not hearing Jay's pleas, Greg opens the door and the entity pounces on him. Jay sees the entity having sex with a dead Greg, then flees by car and spends the night outdoors. On a beach, Jay sees three young men on a boat. She then undresses and walks into the water, though it is unclear if she does anything with them. Back home, Paul, willing to take the risk, offers Jay the opportunity to pass it on to him, but she refuses.

The group plans to kill the entity by luring it into a swimming pool and dropping electrical appliances into the water. Jay, waiting in the pool, spots the entity and realizes it has taken the appearance of her deceased father. Instead of entering the pool, it throws the devices at her. Firing at an invisible target, Paul accidentally wounds Yara, but shoots the entity in the head. They then cover it with a sheet, and Paul shoots it once more, causing it to fall into the pool. As Jay tries to get out of the pool, it pulls her underwater by the ankle. Paul shoots it again in the head and it sinks to the bottom, allowing Jay to escape. She approaches the pool and sees no body, but a mist of blood. Jay and Paul have sex. That night, Paul drives through town, passing prostitutes. Later, Jay and Paul walk down the street holding hands, as a figure walks behind them.

Cast
 Maika Monroe as Jaime "Jay" Height, a young woman targeted by the entity
 Keir Gilchrist as Paul Bolduan, a friend of Jay, Kelly, and Yara
 Olivia Luccardi as Yara Davis, Kelly's friend
 Lili Sepe as Kelly Height, Jaime's sister
 Daniel Zovatto as Greg Hannigan, Jay and Kelly's neighbor
 Jake Weary as Hugh / Jeff Redmond, Jaime's former boyfriend and a target of the entity
 Bailey Spry as Annie Marshall, one of the entity's victims
 Debbie Williams as Mrs. Height, Jaime and Kelly's mother
 Ruby Harris as Mrs. Redmond, Jeff's mother

Featured as forms of the entity are Ingrid Mortimer, Alexyss Spradlin, Mike Lanier, and Don Hails. Ruby Harris also portrays the entity while it is in the form of Greg's mother and Ele Bardha portrays it in the form of Jay's father.

Production

Development 
Writer and director David Robert Mitchell conceived the film based on recurring dreams he had in his youth about being followed: "I didn't use those images for the film, but the basic idea and the feeling I used. From what I understand, it's an anxiety dream. Whatever I was going through at that time, my parents divorced when I was around that age, so I imagine it was something to do with that." The role that sexual transmission plays came later, from Mitchell's desire for something that could transfer between people.

Mitchell started writing the film in 2011 while working on a separate film he intended to be his second feature film; however, Mitchell struggled with this would-be second feature and made It Follows as his next film instead. Mitchell realized that the concept he was working on was tough to describe and thus refused to discuss the plot when asked what he was working on, reasoning later, "When you say it out loud, it sounds like the worst thing ever."

The film was shot in late 2013 in Detroit, Michigan. Mitchell used wide-angle lenses when filming to give the film an expansive look, and cited the works of George Romero and John Carpenter as influences on the film's compositions and visual aesthetic. The film's monster, shot composition and overall aesthetic were influenced by the work of contemporary photographer Gregory Crewdson. Director of photography Mike Gioulakis said: "We're both big fans of the still photographer Gregory Crewdson and David had him in his look book from day one. [Crewdson's] photographs have the same kind of surreal suburban imagery that we wanted for It Follows."

Music 
The score was composed by Rich Vreeland, better known as Disasterpeace. It was released on February 2, 2015, via Editions Milan Music with a digital booklet. The digital version of the album went on sale March 10.

Release
It Follows premiered at the 2014 Cannes Film Festival on May 17, 2014. It was released theatrically in France on February 4, 2015 and in the United Kingdom on February 27. It was given a limited release in the United States on March 13 and a wide release on March 27 in 1,200 theaters. That same day, the film also received a limited release in Canada by Mongrel Media.

Reception

Box office
It Follows earned $163,453 in its opening weekend from four theaters at an average of $40,863 per theater, making it the best limited opening for a film released in the United States and Canada in 2015. The film made its international debut in the United Kingdom on February 27, 2015, where it earned $573,290 (£371,142) on 190 screens for the #8 position. The following week, the film dropped two spots to #10 with a weekend gross of $346,005 (£229,927) from 240 screens. The film had a domestic gross of $14.7 million and an international gross of $8.6 million for a worldwide total of $23.3 million.

Critical reception
It Follows received critical acclaim. On review aggregator website Rotten Tomatoes, it holds a 95% approval rating and a rating average score of 8.10/10, based on 270 reviews. The critical consensus states: "Smart, original and, above all, terrifying, It Follows is the rare modern horror film that works on multiple levels – and leaves a lingering sting." On review aggregator website Metacritic, the film has an average rating of 83 out of 100, based on 37 critics, indicating "universal acclaim". On Rotten Tomatoes' aggregation, it was ranked as the sixth most-praised film of the year, and the ninth most-praised horror film of the 2010s. Peter Debruge of Variety gave an overall positive review, saying: "Starting off strong before losing its way in the end, this stylish, suspenseful chiller should significantly broaden Mitchell's audience without disappointing his early supporters in the slightest."

David Rooney of The Hollywood Reporter said, "Creepy, suspenseful and sustained, this skillfully made lo-fi horror movie plays knowingly with genre tropes and yet never winks at the audience, giving it a refreshing face-value earnestness that makes it all the more gripping." Tim Robey of The Daily Telegraph gave the film five out of five stars and said, "With its marvellously suggestive title and thought-provoking exploration of sex, this indie chiller is a contemporary horror fan's dream come true." Ignatiy Vishnevetsky of The A.V. Club said, "Despite all the fun-to-unpack ideas swirling around Mitchell's premise, this is first and foremost a showcase for his considerable talents as a widescreen visual stylist, which are most apparent in the movie's deftly choreographed, virtuoso 360° pans." Mike Pereira of Bloody Disgusting described the film as a "creepy, mesmerizing exercise in minimalist horror" and labeled it as "a classical horror masterpiece." Michael Nordine of Vice named It Follows as "the best horror film in years", and critic Mark Frauenfelder called it "the best horror film in over a decade".

Analysis 
It Follows has sparked numerous interpretations from film critics in regard to the source of "it" and the film's symbolism. Critics have interpreted the film as a parable about HIV/AIDS, other sexually transmitted infections and the social perceptions thereof; the sexual revolution; "primal anxieties" about intimacy; and post-Great Recession economic anxiety. Mitchell stated: "I'm not personally that interested in where 'it' comes from. To me, it's dream logic in the sense that they're in a nightmare, and when you're in a nightmare there's no solving the nightmare. Even if you try to solve it." Mitchell said that while Jaime "opens herself up to danger through sex, the one way in which she can free herself from that danger... We're all here for a limited amount of time and we can't escape our mortality... but love and sex are two ways in which we can at least temporarily push death away."

Possible sequel
Following the film's success, Radius-TWC co-president Tom Quinn announced that the studio was looking into a possible sequel. Quinn has expressed the idea of flipping the concept of the first film around, with Jay or another protagonist going down the chain to find the origin of "it."

References

External links
 
 
 
 

2014 films
2014 horror films
2014 independent films
2010s monster movies
2010s supernatural horror films
2010s teen horror films
American independent films
American monster movies
American supernatural horror films
American teen horror films
Films about curses
Films about invisibility
Films about shapeshifting
Films about stalking
Films directed by David Robert Mitchell
Films set in Michigan
Films shot in Detroit
Juvenile sexuality in films
Films set in a movie theatre
2010s English-language films
2010s American films